William Nathan Oatis (January 4, 1914 – September 16, 1997) was an American journalist who gained international attention when he was charged with espionage by the Czechoslovak Socialist Republic in 1951.  He was subsequently jailed until 1953.

Early life
Born in Marion, Indiana, Oatis began his journalism career with his high school newspaper, studied at DePauw University for one year and in 1933 returned to Marion, where he worked for the Leader-Tribune. In 1937, he started working for the Associated Press in Indianapolis, Indiana.

Oatis served in the U.S. Army during World War II, studying Japanese at the University of Minnesota in Minneapolis.  In 1950, he married Laurabelle Zack, who worked in the AP's reference library in New York. The marriage took place in London.

Arrest and detention
Oatis was working as the AP bureau chief in Prague, Czechoslovakia, when he was arrested on April 23, 1951.  Deprived of sleep and subjected to continuous interrogation for 42 hours, Oatis signed a statement confessing to the charge of espionage. The case made international headlines, as well as leading to trade and travel embargos against Czechoslovakia. During his trial, he confessed to espionage on behalf of the United States, and somewhat more implausibly, on behalf of India, saying he collected intelligence on Czechoslovakia for the Indian charge d'affairs in Prague, Ramchundur Goburdhun. Those attending the trial noted when delivering his confession that Oatis spoke in a flat, emotionless voice. 

On July 4, 1951, a Czechoslovak court sentenced Oatis to ten years in prison.  He was released May 16, 1953, shortly after the death of Joseph Stalin and after an angry letter from President Dwight D. Eisenhower to the Czechoslovak government. The Czechoslovak government said it had been moved to pardon Oatis by a poignant plea from Oatis' wife, Laurabelle.  Oatis contracted tuberculosis during his imprisonment and sought treatment shortly after his release. After his release, Oatis retracted his confession, and maintained that he merely cross-checked information with foreign diplomats such as his friend Goburdhun before writing a story.

A Czechoslovak court cleared him of all charges in 1959, but the decision was reversed in 1968 after the Warsaw Pact invasion of Czechoslovakia.  In 1990, after Czechoslovakia's "Velvet Revolution" the previous year, he was cleared again.

Later career

Oatis went on to cover the United Nations for three decades and retired in 1984 after a 47-year career at the AP. He was elected president of the United Nations Correspondents Association in 1970.  In 1992, Oatis was inducted into the Indiana Journalism Hall of Fame.

Oatis died September 16, 1997 at Long Island College Hospital in Brooklyn, New York from complications of Alzheimer's disease.  He was survived by his sons Jonathan and Jeremy.  His wife Laurabelle died of natural causes on June 19, 2012, at the age of 88.

Books

Notes and references

Further reading
 Edward Alwood, "The Spy Case of AP Correspondent William Oatis: A Muddled Victim/Hero Myth of the Cold War," Journalism and Mass Communication Quarterly, vol. 87, No. 2 (Summer 2010) pp. 263–280.
 William N. Oatis, "Why I Confessed," Life, September 21, 1953, p. 131.
  Slavomír Michálek: Prípad Oatis. Československý komunistický režim verzus dopisovateľ Associated Press. (Case Oatis. Czechoslovak communist regime versus Associated Press correspondent.), Bratislava, ÚPN, 2005, 293 pages, .

External links
 Associated Press Obituary
 Mention on Associated Press history page
 William N. Oatis Memorial
 Indiana Journalism Hall of Fame
 William N. Oatis profile, Indiana Journalism Hall of Fame
 Eulogy by Jeremy Oatis
 Eulogy by Jonathan Oatis

1914 births
1997 deaths
University of Minnesota College of Liberal Arts alumni
American male journalists
DePauw University alumni
People from Marion, Indiana
Associated Press reporters
Prisoners and detainees of Czechoslovakia
Deaths from dementia in New York (state)
Deaths from Alzheimer's disease
American people imprisoned abroad
Journalists from Indiana
Military personnel from Indiana
American people convicted of spying for the United States
American expatriates in Czechoslovakia
20th-century American non-fiction writers
20th-century American businesspeople
20th-century American male writers
20th-century American journalists